The Étoile Sportive du Sahel Volleyball Club (often referred to as ESS) is one of Étoile du Sahel club's sections that represent the club in Tunisia and international volleyball competitions, the club team section based in Sousse since the year 1957.

Technical and managerial staff

Honors

National Achievements
Tunisian League :
 Winners (9 titles) : 1994–95, 1999–20, 2000–01, 2001–02, 2005–06, 2010–11, 2011–12, 2013-14, 2016-17
 Runners-Up :
 Third-Place :
Tunisian Cup :
 Winners (7 cups) : 1994–95, 1997–98, 2000–01, 2005–06, 2007–08, 2014-15, 2015-16
 Runners-Up (11 vice champions) : 1996–97, 1998–99, 1999–00, 2001–02, 2003–04, 2004-05, 2006-07, 2013-14, 2016–17, 2017–18, 2018–19
Tunisian Supercup :
 Winners (3x Supercups) : 2006–07, 2009–10, 2016–17

Regional Achievements
Arab Clubs Championship :
 Winners (2 title) : 1995, 2016
 Runners-up (2 vice champions) : 2000, 2007

International Achievements
African Club Championship :
 Winners (2 titles) : 2001, 2002
 Runners-Up (4 vice champions) : 1995, 1996, 2012, 2017

African Volleyball Cup Winners' Cup :

 Winners (1 x title) : 2001

 Runners up (1 x vice champions) : 2006

Head coaches
This is a list of the senior team's head coaches in the recent years.

As of 2014

Notable players
Tunisia
 Noureddine Hfaiedh
 Chaker Ghezal
 Hichem Ben Romdhane 
 Slim Chebbi 
 Tarek Sammari 
 Makram Temimi 
 
Europe
 David Zoltàn

Africa
 Thomas Aroko

Presidents

References

External links
 www.etoile-du-sahel.com

Tunisian volleyball clubs
1957 establishments in Tunisia
Volleyball clubs established in 1957
Sport in Tunisia